Martin John Flaherty (September 24, 1853 – June 10, 1920) was an outfielder in Major League Baseball for one game in . He struck out in both of his at bats. He played this game on August 18 for the team that represents the city of his birth, Worcester Ruby Legs. He died in Providence, Rhode Island at the age of 66, and is interred at St. Anne's Cemetery in East Providence, Rhode Island.

References

External links

1853 births
1920 deaths
19th-century baseball players
Baseball players from Worcester, Massachusetts
Major League Baseball outfielders
Worcester Ruby Legs players